was a  after Shōji and before Genkyū. This period spanned the years from February 1201 through February 1204.

Change of era
 1201 ; 1201: The new era name was created to mark an event of shin'yū (辛酉), which is considered as the year of revolution in Sexagenary cycle. The previous era ended and a new one commenced in Shōji 3, on the 13th day of the 2nd month of 1201.

Events of the Kennin era
 1201 (Kennin 1, May): The Kennin Rebellion is defeated.
 1202 (Kennin 2, 1st month): Nitta Yoshishige, the deputy director for cuisine of Dairi (大炊助) in Daijō-kan, died. His court rank had been of the second rank of the fifth class (従五位下).
 1202 (Kennin 2, 7th month): Minamoto no Yoriie was raised in the court's hierarchic standing to the second rank of the second class; and he was created the 2nd shōgun of the Kamakura shogunate.
 1202 (Kennin 2, 10th month):  Naidaijin Minamoto no Michichika died at 54;  and his court position was then filled by dainagon Fujiwara no Takatada.
 1202 (Kennin 2): On orders from Shōgun Minamoto no Yoriie, the monk Eisai founded Kennin-ji, a Zen temple and monastery in the Rinzai sect.
 1203 (Kennin 3, 8th month): Shōgun Yoriie fell gravely ill.
 1203 (Kennin 3, 9th month): Yoriie shaved his head and became a Buddhist priest; and the emperor named Minamoto no Sanetomo as the 3rd shōgun; and Hōjō Tokimasa became Sanetomo's shikken (regent).

Notes

References
 Brown, Delmer and Ichiro Ishida. (1979). The Future and the Past: a translation and study of the 'Gukanshō', an interpretative history of Japan written in 1219.  Berkeley: University of California Press. ;  OCLC 5145872
 Kitagawa, Hiroshi and Bruce T. Tsuchida, eds. (1975). The Tale of the Heike. Tokyo: University of Tokyo Press. 	; ; ; ;  OCLC 193064639
 Nussbaum, Louis-Frédéric and Käthe Roth. (2005).  Japan encyclopedia. Cambridge: Harvard University Press. ;  OCLC 58053128
 Titsingh, Isaac. (1834). Nihon Odai Ichiran; ou,  Annales des empereurs du Japon.  Paris: Royal Asiatic Society, Oriental Translation Fund of Great Britain and Ireland. OCLC 5850691
 Varley, H. Paul. (1980). A Chronicle of Gods and Sovereigns: Jinnō Shōtōki of Kitabatake Chikafusa. New York: Columbia University Press. ;  OCLC 6042764

External links
 National Diet Library, "The Japanese Calendar" -- historical overview plus illustrative images from library's collection

Japanese eras
1200s in Japan